Pendik is an underground station on the M4 line of the Istanbul Metro. Located under the Pendik interchange on the D.100 in the Bahçelievler neighborhood of Pendik, Istanbul, it was opened on 10 October 2016 along with the  expansion from Kartal to Pendik. IETT offers bus service to bridge the gap.

Station Layout

Connections
Connections to IETT Bus service are available via the Pendik Köprüsü bus stop. The stop is located on the upper level (Ankara Cd.) and lower level (D.100). The following routes stop here:

132 — Akfırat/Tepeören - Kartal
132A — Çamlık Mahallesi - Kartal
132B — Akfırat Evleri - Kartal Metro
132D — Kurtdoğmuş/Ballıca - Kartal
132E — Emirli/Kurnaköy - Kartal
132H — Pendik YHT - Sabiha Gökçen Havalimanı 
132K — Yenişehir - Kartal
132P — Veysel Karani/Sultanbeyli - Kartal
133GP — Göçbeyli - Kartal
KM28 — Okan Üniversitesi - Pendik YHT

References

Railway stations opened in 2016
Istanbul metro stations
Pendik
2016 establishments in Turkey